Charles Michael "Chuck" Carter is a video game and film artist. He and Robyn Miller designed and rendered the environments in the video game Myst. After Myst, he was an artist for Westwood's Command & Conquer and Command & Conquer: Red Alert series and a digital matte painter on the television series Babylon 5. His digital art clients include Disney, NASA, National Geographic, Scientific American, and BBC. In 2017 Chuck founded his own video game studio, Eagre Games, and released the video game ZED in June, 2019. In September of 2021, Chuck joined Standard Magic, a virtual and augmented reality startup based in Maine as Creative Director.

References

External links

https://web.archive.org/web/20150409074445/http://www.gdcvault.com/play/1018048/Classic-Game-Postmortem
https://web.archive.org/web/20141229105641/http://www.mainemedia.edu/instructors/photo/chuck-carter
https://web.archive.org/web/20150221130157/http://mrillustrated.com/mystnoticed.php

Video game designers
Living people
1957 births